Quentin Snider (born February 14, 1996) is an American professional basketball player for Stal Ostrów Wielkopolski of the Polish Basketball League (PLK).

High School career
Snider played for Ballard High School, at Louisville, Kentucky.

College career
Snider played for Louisville from 2014 until 2018.

Professional career
Snider started his professional with Benfica in Portugal. After he played ten games for Benfica he was waived. As a result, he signed with Portuguese club Imortal. With Imortal, he averaged 7 points and 3.4 assists per game.

In September 2019, Snider signed with Feyenoord of the Dutch Basketball League (DBL). He led the team in scoring with 19.1 points per game.

On August 7, 2020, he joined AEK Larnaca of the Cypriot League. Snider averaged 14.9 points, 3.9 rebounds, 5.8 assists, and 1.1 steals per game. On June 27, 2021, he re-signed with the team.

On July 21, 2022, he has signed with Stal Ostrów Wielkopolski of the Polish Basketball League (PLK).

References

External links
 Quentin Snider at RealGM

1996 births
Living people
AEK Larnaca B.C. players
American men's basketball players
Dutch Basketball League players
Feyenoord Basketball players
Louisville Cardinals men's basketball players
Point guards
S.L. Benfica basketball players
Stal Ostrów Wielkopolski players